Thatsaphone Saysouk (born 13 September 2000) is a Laotian footballer currently playing as a forward.

Career statistics

International

References

2000 births
Living people
Laotian footballers
Laos international footballers
Association football forwards